The Jouarres Aqueduct is one of several aqueducts on the Canal du Midi.  In Jouarres le Vieux France, it carries the canal over a small stream.  It is one of three original aqueducts created by Pierre-Paul Riquet during the building of the canal from 1667 to 1681.

See also
Locks on the Canal du Midi
Canal du Midi

References

Aqueducts on Canal du Midi